Bassano Politi was a 16th-century Italian mathematician.

He published Questio de modalibus, a book where he collected several medieval treatises by Thomas Bradwardine, Nicole Oresme, Biagio Pelacani, and Giovanni de Casali.

Works

References 

16th-century Italian mathematicians
16th-century deaths